Richard Cassius Lee Moncure (February 5, 1872 – May 25, 1937) was an American Democratic politician who served as a member of the Virginia Senate, representing the state's 13th district.

He was elected to the Virginia Senate in 1911 and resigned after the 1914 session to accept appointment as Collector of Internal Revenue for the Eastern District of Virginia.

He was named for his maternal grandfather, Richard C. L. Moncure, a judge of the Virginia Supreme Court of Appeals.

His cousin Frank P. Moncure (another grandson of Justice R.C.L. Moncure) represented Stafford and Prince William Counties in the Virginia House of Delegates from 1936-1939 and 1944–1959. His son R.C.L. Moncure Jr. was elected Stafford County's Commissioner of Revenue and re-elected several times, the last in 1939.

References

External links

1872 births
1937 deaths
Democratic Party Virginia state senators
Moncure family
Politicians from Richmond, Virginia
University of Richmond alumni
College of William & Mary alumni
Burials at Aquia Church Cemetery